Prionapterus is a genus of beetles in the family Cerambycidae, containing the following species:

 Prionapterus breyeri Bruch, 1929
 Prionapterus staphilinus Guérin-Méneville, 1831
 Prionapterus suspectus Galileo & Martins, 1990
 Prionapterus travassosi Lane, 1938
 Prionapterus woltersi Bruch, 1925

References

Prioninae